Nudo di donna (internationally released as Portrait of a Woman, Nude and Portrait of a Nude Woman) is a 1981 Italian mystery - comedy film. It is the third and final film directed by Nino Manfredi. The original director, Alberto Lattuada, was replaced after the first few weeks of shooting, due to disputes with Manfredi, who also played the lead.

Cast 
Nino Manfredi: Sandro
Eleonora Giorgi: Laura / Riri
Jean-Pierre Cassel: Pireddu
Georges Wilson: Arch. Zanetto
Carlo Bagno: Giovanni
Beatrice Ring: Beatrice
Giuseppe Maffioli: The drunkard

References

External links

1981 films
Commedia all'italiana
Films set in Venice
Films directed by Nino Manfredi
Adultery in films
1981 comedy films
1980s Italian-language films
1980s Italian films